Khabur ware is a specific type of pottery named after the Khabur River region, in northeastern Syria, where large quantities of it were found by the archaeologist Max Mallowan at the site of Chagar Bazar. The pottery's distribution is not confined to the Khabur region, but spreads across northern Iraq and is also found at a few sites in Turkey and Iran.

Archaeologists associate the pottery with the cuneiform texts dated to the reign of Shamshi-Adad I, although it is not clear how much earlier it was manufactured.

Overview

History
Four main Khabur ware phases are established, 1-4. While the starting date for phase 1 is inconclusive, a tentative date of ca. 1900 BC is suggested based on evidence from Tell Brak. The beginning of the second, and the main, phase of Khabur ware is dated to the reign of Shamshi-Adad I (ca. 1813 BC), based on evidence from Chagar Bazar, Tell al-Rimah, Tell Taya and Tell Leilan. The third phase of Khabur ware is dated to ca. 1750, and lasts until ca. 1550. The fourth and last phase, is a period shared between Khabur ware and Nuzi ware, and ends with its disappearance ca. 1400 BC.

Designs
The pottery is wheel-made and decorated with monochrome designs in red, brown or black. The designs found on the pottery are combinations of simple motifs, usually geometric with horizontal bands, triangles and others. Naturalistic designs become more common in its later phases. Its final phase manifests jars with button bases and tall vertical necks, a form characteristic of the painted Nuzi ware, of the Late Bronze Age, which indicates an overlap between the two wares until the disappearance of the Khabur ware.

Gallery

References

Archaeology of Syria
Archaeology of the Near East
Ancient pottery
Archaeological discoveries in Syria
Syrian pottery